The Traditionalist or Perennialist School is a group of 20th- and 21st-century thinkers who believe in the existence of a perennial wisdom or perennial philosophy, primordial and universal truths which form the source for, and are shared by, all the major world religions.

The early proponents of this school of thought are René Guénon, Ananda Coomaraswamy, and Frithjof Schuon. Other notable members include Seyyed Hossein Nasr, Titus Burckhardt, Martin Lings, William Stoddart, Jean-Louis Michon, Marco Pallis, and Huston Smith.

Concept
According to the members of the Traditionalist School, also known as the Perennialist School, all major world religions are founded upon common primordial and universal metaphysical truths. The perspective of its authors is often referred to as philosophia perennis (perennial philosophy), which is both "absolute Truth and infinite Presence". Absolute Truth is "the perennial wisdom (sophia perennis) that stands as the transcendent source of all the intrinsically orthodox religions of humankind". Infinite Presence is "the perennial religion (religio perennis) that lives within the heart of all intrinsically orthodox religions." According to Frithjof Schuon,

The Traditionalist vision of a perennial wisdom is not based on mystical experiences, but on metaphysical intuitions. It is "intuited directly through divine intellect." This divine intellect is different from reason, and makes it possible to discern "the sacred unity of reality that is attested in all authentic esoteric expressions of tradition"; it is "the presence of divinity within each human waiting to be uncovered." According to Schuon,

For the Traditionalists, perennial philosophy has a transcendent dimension – Truth or Wisdom – and an immanent dimension – infinite Presence or Union. Thus, on the one hand, "discernment between the Real and the unreal, or the Absolute and the relative", and on the other hand, "mystical concentration on the Real".

According to the Traditionalists, this truth has been lost in the modern world through the rise of novel secular philosophies stemming from the Enlightenment, and modernism itself is considered an abnormality. Traditionalists see their approach as a justifiable longing for the past; in Schuon's words: "If to recognize what is true and just is "nostalgia for the past," it is quite clearly a crime or a disgrace not to feel this nostalgia". 

Traditionalists insist on the necessity for affiliation to one of the great religions of the world, without which no esoteric path is possible.

Meaning of Tradition

People
The ideas of the Traditionalist School are considered to begin with René Guénon. Other members of that school of thought include Ananda Coomaraswamy, Frithjof Schuon, Titus Burckhardt, Martin Lings, Hossein Nasr, William Stoddart, Jean-Louis Michon, Marco Pallis, Huston Smith, Harry Oldmeadow, Reza Shah-Kazemi, and Patrick Laude. Some academics include Julius Evola in this School, although Evola presents many differences in relation to those mentioned. Another author eventually linked to perennialism is Mircea Eliade, although Eliade's link is nuanced and often contested.

René Guénon
A major theme in the works of René Guénon (18861951) is the contrast between traditional world views and modernism, "which he considered to be an anomaly in the history of mankind." For Guénon, the world is a manifestation of metaphysical principles, which are preserved in the perennial teachings of the world religions, but were lost to the modern world. For Guénon, "the malaise of the modern world lies in its relentless denial of the metaphysical realm."

Early on, Guénon was attracted to Sufism, and in 1912 he was initiated in the Shadhili order. He started writing after his doctoral dissertation was rejected, and he left academia in 1923. His works center on the return to these traditional world views, trying to reconstruct the Perennial Philosophy.

In his first books and essays, he envisaged a restoration of traditional "intellectualité" in the West on the basis of Roman Catholicism and Freemasonry. He gave up early on a purely Christian basis for a traditionalist restoration of the West, searching for other traditions. He denounced the lure of Theosophy and neo-occultism in the form of Spiritism, two influential movements that were flourishing in his lifetime. In 1930, he moved to Egypt, where he lived until his death in 1951.

Influence
Through its close affiliation with Sufism, the traditionalist perspective has been gaining ground in Asia and the Islamic world at large.

Iran
In Iran, it was introduced by Hossein Nasr as well as, earlier, by Ali Shariati, the intellectual considered the ideologue of the Iranian Revolution who recommended Guénon to his students. While it never acquired a mass following, its influence on the elite can be measured by the fact that when Ayatollah Khomeini organized the Supreme Council of the Cultural Revolution, out of the seven members designed to serve it, three were acquainted with Traditionalist ideas, namely Abdolkarim Soroush, Reza Davari Ardakani, and Nasrullah PourJavadi.

Pakistan
Hasan Askari, an important writer and literary critic, was directly influenced by Guénon, and, through him, Muhammad Shafi Deobandi and his son Muhammad Taqi Usmani, some of the country's most influential Islamic scholars, integrated Guénon's works in the curriculum of the Darul Uloom Karachi, one of the most important madrassa or religious seminary in the country.

Other important figures of Pakistan influenced by Traditionalism include A. K. Brohi, who was seen as close to General Zia-ul-Haq, and psychologist Muhammad Ajmal.

Traditionalism and far-right movements
Julius Evola was an Italian Traditionalist influenced by Guénon but from whom he departed on many points, which did not allow him to be assimilated to the Guénonian Traditionalist School. The ideas of Evola have been associated with some far-right movements, such as the European Nouvelle Droite ("New Right"), and Italian Fascists during the Years of Lead. 

Mark Sedgwick's Against the Modern World, published in 2004, gives an analysis of political traditionalism:

Various influential figures in twenty-first century far-right populist movements have affiliated with Traditionalism, often with Evola in particular. According to the book War for Eternity by Benjamin R. Teitelbaum, former Donald Trump advisor Steve Bannon and Brazilian writer Olavo de Carvalho, all have associated with Traditionalism and have interacted with each other based on those interests. Although Carvalho denies this association.

Alain de Benoist, the founder of the Nouvelle Droite, declared in 2013 that the influence of Guénon on his political school was very weak and that he does not consider him a major author for his work.

See also 

 Ivan Aguéli
 Kurt Almqvist
 William Chittick
 James Cutsinger
 Michael Oren Fitzgerald
 Walter James, 4th Baron Northbourne
 Patrick Laude
 Tage Lindbom
 Jean-Louis Michon
 Seyyed Hossein Nasr
 Harry Oldmeadow
 Marco Pallis
 Whitall Perry
 A. K. Saran
 Leo Schaya
 Reza Shah-Kazemi
 Philip Sherrard
 Huston Smith
 Wolfgang Smith
 William Stoddart
 Michel Valsan
 Elémire Zolla

Notes

References

Sources

Primary
 
 
 
 
Secondary
 
 
 
 
 
 
 
 
 

Web-sources

Further reading
Traditionalist School
 Mark Sedgwick, Against the Modern World: Traditionalism and the Secret Intellectual History of the Twentieth Century 
 Harry Oldmeadow, Traditionalism: Religion in the Light of the Perennial Philosophy (2000) 
 Carl W. Ernst, "Traditionalism, the Perennial Philosophy and Islamic Studies" in the MESA Bulletin (1994).

René Guénon
 Xavier Accart, René Guénon ou Le renversement des clartés Paris, Milano: Arché, 2005.
 Marie-France James, Esoterisme et Christianisme: autour de René Guénon (1981).
 Jean-Pierre Laurant, "Le problème de René Guénon", Revue de l'histoire des religions (1971).
 Jean-Pierre Laurant, René Guénon: Les enjeux d'une lecture (2006) 
 Jean-Pierre Laurant and Paul Barbanegra, eds, René Guénon [Cahier de l'Herne] (1985).
 Pierre-Marie Sigaud, ed., Rene Guenon [Dossiers H] (1984).

Julius Evola
 Franco Ferraresi, "Julius Evola: Tradition, Reaction and the Radical Right" in Archives Européennes de Sociologie (1987).
 Roger Griffin, "Revolts Against the Modern World: The Blend of Literary and Historical Fantasy in the Italian New Right" in Literature and History (1985).

Writings by members
 
 
 Andrew Rawlinson, The Book of Enlightened Masters: Western Teachers in Eastern Traditions 
 Huston Smith, Forgotten Truth: The Common Vision of the World's Religions (1976), reprint ed. 1992, Harper San Francisco, 
 Alice Lucy Trent, The Feminine Universe: An Exposition of the Ancient Wisdom from the Primordial Feminine Perspective (2010) Golden Order Press, 
 William W. Quinn, Jr., The Only Tradition (1996) 
 

Perennialism
 Antoine Faivre, ed, Dossier on "Perennialisme" in Aries 11 (1990).

External links

Sacred Web – A Traditional Journal
Perennialist/Traditionalist website
Interview with Huston Smith on the primordial tradition
Review of Against the Modern World: Traditionalism and the Secret Intellectual History of the Twentieth Century{dead link)
World Wisdom Books
Fons Vitae Books
Revista de Estudios Tradicionales
La Tradición – Textos Tradicionales (Spanish)
Traditionalists.org: A website for the Study of (Traditionalism and the Traditionalists)
The Matheson Trust for the study of comparative religion
A review of some Traditionalist books by Carl W. Ernst "Traditionalism, the Perennial Philosophy, and Islamic Studies", Middle East Studies Association Bulletin, vol. 28, no. 2 (December 1994), pp. 176–81

 
20th-century philosophy
Esotericism
Neo-Vedanta
Philosophical schools and traditions